Camp Creek is a populated place situated in Maricopa County, Arizona, United States. It is located in the Tonto National Forest.

References

Populated places in Maricopa County, Arizona